The Abu Dhabi City Derby or the Capital Derby is the Derby between Emirati football teams Al Jazira and Al Wahda.

Background
The rivalry began in 1974 when both clubs were formed in the same city and neighborhood, both teams are less than two kilometers away from each other, but both clubs only started to play more often in the 1980s when Al Jazira finally got promoted to the UAE League. The rivalry was intensified during the 90s when Al Wahda experienced a rise in the league, winning their first title in 1999 while Al Jazira fell short and would have to wait until 2011 to experience their first league title. In 2005–06 season, Al Wahda's 5–1 victory over Al Jazira denied them the league title as Al Jazira finished two points behind them and the league winners Al Ahli. In 2009–10 season, Al Jazira was set to win the league unbeaten but ultimately lost 2–1 to Al Wahda and lost first place, Baiano who was a former Al Jazira player scored both goals in that match. Al Wahda would win its remaining games to clinch the title. Al Jazira would later manage to do the double in 2011 were they won their first league title and smashed Al Wahda 4–0 in the President's cup final.

Biggest Wahda wins 
Al Jazira 1–5 Al Wahda 15 October 2005

Al Wahda 6–0 Al Jazira 4 January 2017

Biggest Jazira wins
Al Jazira 4–0 Al Wahda 15 February 2009

Al Wahda 0–4 Al Jazira 11 April 2011

Al Jazira 5–1 Al Wahda 19 January 2017

Al Wahda 0–4 Al Jazira 6 December 2019

Match History – Summary

Last five fixtures

Head to head record
The two teams have played a total of 79 games in league and cup.

Last update: 21 May 2022

Honours

References

Football competitions in the United Arab Emirates
Football rivalries in the United Arab Emirates
1980s establishments in the United Arab Emirates